The 13th Pan American Games were held in Havana, Cuba from August 2 to August 18, 1991.

Medals

Gold

Men's 1,000m Sprint (Track): Richard Young
Women's 1,000m Sprint (Track): Tanya Dubnicoff

Women's Hoop: Mary Fuzesi
Women's Team: Canada

Women's 50m Freestyle: Kristin Topham
Women's 100m Butterfly: Kristin Topham

Men's 470: Nigel Cochrane Jeff Eckard
Women's Laser Radial: Shona Moss
Men's Finn: Lawrence Lemieux

Silver

Men's Pole Vault: Doug Wood
Men's 4 × 100 m Relay: Canada
Women's 10,000 metres: Lisa Harvey

Men's Welterweight (– 67 kg): Greg Johnson
Men's Middleweight (– 75 kg): Chris Johnson

Women's 3,000m Individual Pursuit (Track): Clara Hughes

Women's 3m Springboard: Paige Gordon

Women's Uneven Bars: Mylène Fleury

Women's All-Around: Mary Fuzesi
Women's Rope: Mary Fuzesi
Women's Ball: Mary Fuzesi

Men's Bantamweight (– 60 kg): Ewan Beaton
Men's Featherweight (– 65 kg): Jean-Pierre Cantin

Men's 4 × 100 m Freestyle: Canada
Women's 100m Backstroke: Nikki Dryden
Women's 200m Backstroke: Nikki Dryden
Women's 200m Breaststroke: Chantal Dubois
Women's 200m Individual Medley: Joanne Malar
Women's 400m Individual Medley: Joanne Malar
Women's 4 × 100 m Freestyle: Canada
Women's 4 × 200 m Freestyle: Canada

Women's Team: Canada

Men's Freestyle (– 100 kg): John Matile
Men's Freestyle (– 130 kg): Andy Borodow

Women's Sailboard: Edithe Trepanier

Bronze

Men's 1,500 metres: Dan Bertoia
Women's 1,500 metres: Sarah Howell

Men's Lightweight (– 60 kg): William Irwin
Men's Light Heavyweight (– 81 kg): Robert Dale Brown
Men's Heavyweight (– 91 kg): Tom Glesby
Men's Super Heavyweight (+ 91 kg): Terry Campbell

Women's Team Time Trial (Road): Canada

Women's Vault: Jennifer Wood
Women's Team Competition: Canada

Women's All-Around: Susan Cushman
Women's Hoop: Susan Cushman
Women's Ball: Madonna Gimotea
Women's Group: Canada

Women's Extra Lightweight (– 48 kg): Brigitte Lastrade
Women's Half Heavyweight (– 72 kg): Alison Webb
Women's Heavyweight (+ 72 kg): Jane Patterson
Women's Open: Jane Patterson

Men's 400m Individual Medley: Jasen Pratt
Women's 100m Freestyle: Kristin Topham
Women's 200m Freestyle: Kim Paton
Women's 400m Freestyle: Tara-Lynn Seymour
Women's 800m Freestyle: Tara-Lynn Seymour
Women's 200m Backstroke: Joanne Malar
Women's 100m Breaststroke: Lisa Flood
Women's 200m Breaststroke: Lisa Flood
Women's 200m Butterfly: Beth Hazel

Women's Duet: Julie Bibby and Corinne Keddie

Men's Freestyle (– 57 kg): Robert Dawson
Men's Freestyle (– 82 kg): David Hohl
Men's Freestyle (– 90 kg): Gregory Edgelow
Men's Greco-Roman (– 90 kg): Gregory Edgelow
Men's Greco-Roman (– 100 kg): John Matile
Men's Greco-Roman (– 130 kg): Andy Borodow

Men's Sailboard: Murray McCaig

Results by event

Basketball

Men's Team Competition
Preliminary Round (Group B)
Lost to Puerto Rico (77-95)
Lost to Brazil (55-85)
Lost to Uruguay (61-62)
Lost to Mexico (66-79)
Classification Match
9th/10th place: Lost to Bahamas (62-75) → 10th place
Team Roster

Women's Team Competition
Preliminary Round Robin
Lost to United States (70-87)
Lost to Cuba (71-95)
Lost to Brazil (66-74)
Defeated Argentina (81-61)
Semifinals
Lost to Brazil (78-87)
Bronze Medal Match
Lost to United States (61-92) → 4th place
Team Roster

Volleyball

Men's Team Competition
Preliminary Round
Lost to United States (1-3)
Lost to Cuba (0-3)
Lost to Brazil (0-3)
Lost to Argentina (1-3)
Defeated Puerto Rico (3-1)
Classification Match
5th/6th place: Lost to Puerto Rico (2-3) → 6th place
Team Roster

Women's Team Competition
Preliminary Round
Lost to Brazil
Lost to Argentina
Lost to Peru
Lost to Cuba
Defeated United States
Semi Finals
Lost to Cuba (0-3)
Bronze Medal Match
Lost to Peru (0-3) → 4th place
Team Roster

See also

 Canada at the 1990 Commonwealth Games
 Canada at the 1992 Summer Olympics

References

Nations at the 1991 Pan American Games
P
1991